People in the Net, also known as Unwilling Agent, is a 1959 West German Cold War spy film directed by Franz Peter Wirth and starring Hansjörg Felmy, Johanna von Koczian and Hannes Messemer.

The film's sets were designed by the art directors Franz Bi and Max Seefelder. It was shot at the Bavaria Studios in Munich.

Cast
 Hansjörg Felmy as Klaus Martens
 Johanna von Koczian as Gitta Martens
 Hannes Messemer as Braun
 Ingeborg Schöner as Marianne Gardella
 Rosel Schäfer as Daisy Winter
 Hanns Lothar as Stefan
 Gernot Duda as Janos
 Klaus Havenstein as Beamter
 Peter Lühr as Dr. Becker
 Walter Sedlmayr
 Willy Semmelrogge as Lauer
 Olga von Togni as Olga Hajek
 Max Mairich as Fischer
 Alexander Hunzinger as Wagentritt
 Paul Verhoeven as Karel
 Helmut Brasch as Grasdorffer
 Ettore Cella as Luigi Gardella
 Gerhard Just as Herr Liebermann
 Rolf Kralovitz as Berger
 Franziska Liebing as Frau Liebermann
 Anton Reimer as Kriminal-Inspektor

References

Bibliography 
 Bock, Hans-Michael & Bergfelder, Tim. The Concise CineGraph. Encyclopedia of German Cinema. Berghahn Books, 2009.

External links 
 

1959 films
1950s spy drama films
German spy drama films
West German films
1950s German-language films
Films directed by Franz Peter Wirth
Cold War spy films
Bavaria Film films
Films shot at Bavaria Studios
1959 drama films
1950s German films